Diplomphalus is a genus of land snails with an operculum, terrestrial gastropod mollusks in the family Rhytididae.

Species
 Diplomphalus cabriti (Gassies, 1863)
 Diplomphalus mariei (Crosse, 1867)
 Diplomphalus montrouzieri (Souverbie, 1858)
 Diplomphalus solidulus Tryon, 1885
 Diplomphalus vaysseti (Marie, 1871)
Species brought into synonymy
 Diplomphalus fabrei Crosse, 1875 : synonym of Pseudomphalus megei (Lambert, 1873)
 Diplomphalus fischeri Franc, 1953 : synonym of Diplomphalus mariei (Crosse, 1867)
 Diplomphalus huttoni Suter, 1890 : synonym of Cavellioropa huttoni (Suter, 1890)
 Diplomphalus moussoni Suter, 1890 : synonym of Cavellioropa moussoni (Suter, 1890) (original combination)
 Diplomphalus solidula Tryon, 1885 : synonym of Diplomphalus solidulus Tryon, 1885 (incorrect gender agreement of specific

References

External links
 Crosse H. & Fischer P. (1872). [Nouvelles. Armature linguale des Helix inaequalis et .H. cabriti de la Nouvelle-Calédonie. Journal de Conchyliologie. 20 (3): 286-288. Paris]
  Hausdorf B. (2013). Revision of the endemic genera Diplomphalus and Pseudomphalus from New Caledonia (Gastropoda, Rhytididae). Zoosystema. 35(1): 69-88.
 Crosse H. & Fischer P. (1873). Notes sur les caractères du genre Rhytida et du nouveau genre Diplomphalus. Journal de Conchyliologie. 21(1): 13-25

 Rhytididae
Gastropod genera